Kermia margaritifera is a species of sea snail, a marine gastropod mollusc in the family Raphitomidae.

Description
The length of the shell attains 7 mm.

The whorls are rounded or very slightly shouldered, reticulated by longitudinal and revolving fine ribs and lines. The color is yellowish brown, tinged with chestnut, sometimes forming an indistinct central band.

Distribution
This species occurs in the Persian Gulf and off India.

References

 Reeve, L.A. 1843–1846. Monograph of the Genus Pleurotoma. Conchologia Iconica, or Illustrations of the shells of molluscous animals. Vol. 1. London: Reeve Brothers, pls 1–18 (1843), pl. 19 (1844), pls 20–33 (1845), pls 34–40 + index and errata (1846)

External links
 
 Kilburn, R. N. (2009). Genus Kermia (Mollusca: Gastropoda: Conoidea: Conidae: Raphitominae) in South African Waters, with Observations on the Identities of Related Extralimital Species. African Invertebrates. 50(2): 217-236

margaritifera
Gastropods described in 1846